Samuel Flaxington (14 October 1860 – 10 March 1895) was an English first-class cricketer, who played four matches for Yorkshire County Cricket Club in 1882, against Sussex, Gloucestershire, Middlesex and Kent respectively.

Born in Otley, Yorkshire, England, Flaxington was a right-handed batsman, who scored 121 runs at an average of 15.12, with a top score of 57 against Sussex on his debut.

After living at Yeadon at one time, he became a schoolmaster at Otley, playing for the local club in 1886 and 1887. Flaxington committed suicide in March 1895, aged 34, and is buried in Yeadon Cemetery.

References

External links
Cricinfo Profile
Cricket Archive Statistics
Last resting place of Samuel Flaxington

1860 births
1895 deaths
Yorkshire cricketers
People from Otley
English cricketers
1890s suicides
Suicides in England